The Khazar Lankaran 2008–09 season is Khazar Lankaran's fourth Azerbaijan Premier League season. Khazar started the season under the management of Rasim Kara, however he was replaced by Igor Ponomaryov during the season. Khazar finished the season in 4th place and were knocked out of the Azerbaijan Cup at the quarterfinal stage by Baku.

Squad

Transfers

Summer

In:

Out:

Winter

In:

Out:

Competitions

Azerbaijan Premier League

Results

Table

Azerbaijan Cup

UEFA Cup

Qualifying Phase

Squad statistics

Appearances and goals

|-
|colspan="14"|Players who appeared for Khazar Lankaran who left during the season:

|}

Goal scorers

Disciplinary record

Notes
On 31 October 2008, FK NBC Salyan changed their name to FK Mughan.
Qarabağ have played their home games at the Tofiq Bahramov Stadium since 1993 due to the ongoing situation in Quzanlı.

References

External links 
 Khazar Lankaran at Soccerway.com

Khazar Lankaran FK seasons
Khazar Lankaran